The British crown was a denomination of sterling coinage worth  of one pound, or 5 shillings, or 60 (old) pence. The crown was first issued during the reign of Edward VI, as part of the coinage of the Kingdom of England.

Always a heavy silver coin weighing around one ounce, during the 19th and 20th centuries the crown declined from being a real means of exchange to being a coin rarely spent, and minted for commemorative purposes only. Unlike in some territories of the British Empire (such as Jamaica), in the UK the crown was never replaced as circulating currency by a five-shilling banknote.

"Decimal" crowns were minted a few times after decimalisation of the British currency in 1971, initially with a nominal value of 25 (new) pence.  However, commemorative crowns issued since 1990 have a face value of five pounds.

History
The coin's origins lie in the English silver crown, one of many silver coins that appeared in various countries from the 16th century onwards (most famously the Spanish piece of eight), all of similar size and weight (approx 38mm diameter, 25g fine silver) and thus interchangeable in international trade. The Kingdom of England also minted gold Crowns until early in the reign of Charles II.

The dies for all gold and silver coins of Queen Anne and King George I were engraved by John Croker, a migrant originally from Dresden in the Duchy of Saxony.

The British silver crown was always a large coin, and from the 19th century it did not circulate well. However, crowns were usually struck in a new monarch's coronation year, from George IV through Elizabeth II in 1953, with the exceptions of George V and Edward VIII.

The King George V "wreath" crowns struck from 1927 through 1936 (excluding 1935 when the more common "rocking horse" crown was minted to commemorate the King's Silver Jubilee) depict a wreath on the reverse of the coin and were struck in very low numbers. Generally struck late in the year and intended to be purchased as Christmas gifts, they were generally kept rather than circulated. The 1927 "wreath" crowns were struck as proofs only (15,030 minted) and the 1934 coin had a mintage of just 932.

With their large size, many of the later coins were primarily commemoratives. The 1951 issue was for the Festival of Britain, and was only struck in proof condition. The 1953 crown was issued to celebrate the Coronation of Queen Elizabeth II, while the 1960 issue (which carried the same reverse design as the previous crown in 1953) commemorated the British Exhibition in New York. The 1965 issue carried the image of Winston Churchill on the reverse. According to the Standard Catalogue of coins, 19,640,000 of this coin were minted, although intended as collectable pieces the large mintage and lack of precious metal content means these coins are effectively worthless today. Production of the Churchill crown began on 11 October 1965, and stopped in the summer of 1966.

The crown coin was nicknamed the dollar, but is not to be confused with the British trade dollar that circulated in the Orient.

In 2014, a new world record price was achieved for a milled silver crown. The coin was unique, issued as a pattern by engraver Thomas Simon in 1663 and nicknamed the "Reddite Crown". It was presented to Charles II as the new crown piece, but ultimately rejected in favour of the Roettiers Brothers' design. Auctioneers Spink & Son of London sold the coin on 27 March 2014 for £396,000 including commission.

All pre-decimal crowns from 1818 on remain legal tender with a face value of 25p.

Decimal crowns

After decimalisation on 15 February 1971, the 25-pence coin was introduced as a replacement for the crown as a commemorative coin.  These were legal tender and were made with large mintages.

Further issues continued to be minted, initially with a value of twenty-five pence (with no face value shown).  From 1990, the face value of new crown coins was raised to five pounds.

Changing values
The legal tender value of the crown remained as five shillings from 1544 to 1965. However, for most of this period there was no denominational designation or "face value" mark of value displayed on the coin. From 1927 to 1939, the word "CROWN" appears, and from 1951 to 1960 this was changed to "FIVE SHILLINGS". Coins minted since 1818 remain legal tender with a face value of 25 pence.

Although all "normal" issues since 1951 have been composed of cupro-nickel, special proof versions have been produced for sale to collectors, and as gift items, in silver, gold, and occasionally platinum.

The fact that gold £5 crowns are now produced means that there are two different strains of five pound gold coins, namely crowns and what are now termed "quintuple sovereigns" for want of a more concise term.

Numismatically, the term "crown-sized" is used generically to describe large silver or cupro-nickel coins of about 40 mm in diameter. Most Commonwealth countries still issue crown-sized coins for sale to collectors.

New Zealand's original fifty-cent pieces, and Australia's previously round but now dodecagonal fifty-cent piece, although valued at five shillings in predecimal accounting, are all smaller than the standard silver crown pieces issued by those countries (and the UK). They were in fact similarly sized to the predecimal half crown (worth two shillings and sixpence).

Composition
For silver crowns, the grade of silver adhered to the long-standing standard (established in the 12th century by Henry II) – the Sterling Silver standard of 92.5% silver and 7.5% copper. This was a harder-wearing alloy, yet it was still a rather high grade of silver. It went some way towards discouraging the practice of "clipping", though this practice was further discouraged and largely eliminated with the introduction of the milled edge seen on coins today.

In a debasement process which took effect in 1920, the silver content of all British coins was reduced from 92.5% to 50%, with a portion of the remainder consisting of manganese, which caused the coins to tarnish to a very dark colour after they had been in circulation for a significant period.  Silver was eliminated altogether in 1947, with the move to a composition of cupro-nickel – except for proof issues, which returned to the pre-1920 92.5% silver composition.

Modern mintages

The specifications for composition refer to the standard circulation versions. Proof versions continue to be minted in Sterling silver.

Gallery

Quarter sovereign
In 1853, the Royal Mint had produced two patterns for a gold 5-shilling coin for circulation use, one denominated as five shillings and the other as a quarter sovereign, but this coin never went into production, in part due to concerns about the small size of the coin and likely wear in circulation. The quarter sovereign was introduced in 2009 as a bullion coin.

References

External links

 History of Five Shilling Coins on Coins of the UK
 Royal Mint Museum's history of Crown Coin
 Crown, Coin Type from United Kingdom - Online Coin Club

Coins of Great Britain
Coins of the United Kingdom
Quarter-base-unit coins